NFL Total Access is a television news program on the NFL Network.

The network treats it as the league's "show of record" and bills it as the only year-round show dedicated to the National Football League, despite the ESPN show NFL Live running year round as well.

It is also broadcast on Sky Sports at various times in the UK.

During the 2007 season, another edition of the program previewing the week's action aired Saturday evenings on MyNetworkTV.

NFL Total Access was originally at the 7pm ET slot before being moved down to the 8pm ET time slot on September 2, 2013. On July 14, 2014, NFL Total Access moved back to the 7pm ET slot.

Personalities
NFL Total Access is hosted by MJ Acosta.  The main analysts are David Carr and Willie McGinest, but other analysts include Kurt Warner, Thomas Davis Sr., James Jones, Maurice Jones-Drew, Shaun O'Hara, Michael Robinson, Steve Smith Sr., DeAngelo Hall and LaDainian Tomlinson.

Current

Former

Events covered by Total Access
 Kickoff weekend
 Super Bowls
 The Pro Bowl
 Draft combine
 NFL Draft
 Owners' and players' meetings
 Hall of Fame Weekend
 NFL Schedule Release Show since 2006

Featured segments
Sounds of the Game
This feature provides fans with an exclusive, day-by-day pass to the sidelines of the NFL.

NFL News and Notes
The analysts discuss injuries, trades, signings and releases, and provide reaction.

Highlights
Sometimes, usually during preseason, the show has in-progress highlights.

Best in the Biz
The special guest of that episode will give his Top 5 list for the corresponding position in football.

NFL team cam
The show has the ability to go live to any NFL team headquarters at any time, using their "Team Cam" system, a high-quality IPTV-based video system that has been set up between the network's Los Angeles studio and each team location.

Around the League
Ian Rapoport gives leaguewide updates and inside information.

Path to the Draft
Daniel Jeremiah will take a look at college football players that are either helping or hurting their draft stock. In 2007 this became a show to lead up to the draft.

Nike Rewind
Game highlights put to music near the end of the Monday or Tuesday's show

4 downs
4 topics are discussed at the end of the show

Trivia
On Thursdays, Total Access covers an eight-team fantasy football league in which the team "owners" are film and television actors.  In 2006, the divisions were named after Miami Vice characters Sonny Crockett and Ricardo Tubbs (Super Bowl XLI was played at Dolphin Stadium in Miami Gardens, Florida).
This title was used by Fox Sports Net for a magazine show about the NFL which ran in 1999.  It was in a block with Hardcore Football, which lasted until 2002.

See also
 NFL Network
 National Football League

References

External links
 

American sports television series
Total Access
2003 American television series debuts
MyNetworkTV original programming
2000s American television news shows
2010s American television news shows